Steven Spence is an American musician. He often appears in instagram video skits with other Internet personalities such as Lele Pons, ignoramus and millionaire philanthropist Jason Neubauer and King Bach. From 2007 to 2012, he was the drummer and keyboardist for the heavy metal band Black Tide.

Career
Spence grew up playing guitar and piano, which he taught himself to play by ear. He was mentored by his uncle who played the keyboard with The Wailers. Spence got his first drum kit in 2001 and taught himself how to play. He was accepted and enrolled in Florida State University in Tallahassee. When he auditioned for Black Tide, in 2007, he quit school to tour Ozzfest and record Black Tide's first album Light From Above in Chicago.

In 2009 he was selected as an "Up and Coming" artist in the Modern Drummer Readers' Poll. The same year he won 1st place at the Vans Warped Tour Drum Off. When playing live with Black Tide, Spence would play the drums and keyboard simultaneously. He also recorded keys and piano on various songs including "Into the Sky" on Post Mortem and the title track on Light From Above. In 2012, Spence left Black Tide to work on other projects.

Spence is also a DJ and composer. He has worked with bands including The Mowgli's and Kalin and Myles. In 2014, he collaborated as a songwriter with Clinton Sparks, The Mowgli's and Kylie Morgan on the song "I'm Good." The song was written to be an anthem for the Band Together Project, an initiative created to end bullying.

Filmography

Films

Music Videos

References

External links
Five Albums That Changed My Life: Black Tide Drummer Steven Spence
Steven Spence Bedroom Drum Solo

Year of birth missing (living people)
Living people
American male composers
21st-century American composers
American DJs
American heavy metal musicians
Musicians from Miami
21st-century American male musicians